11395 Iphinous, provisional designation: , is a large Jupiter trojan from the Greek camp approximately  in diameter. It was discovered on 15 December 1998, by astronomers with the Lincoln Near-Earth Asteroid Research at the Lincoln Laboratory's Experimental Test Site near Socorro, New Mexico, in the United States. The dark asteroid has a rotation period of 17.4 hours and possibly a spherical shape. The body is one of the 50 largest Jupiter trojans. It was named from Greek mythology after the Achaean soldier Iphinous who was killed by Glaucus in the Trojan War.

Orbit and classification 

Iphinous is a Jovian asteroid orbiting in the leading Greek camp at Jupiter's  Lagrangian point, 60° ahead of the Gas Giant's orbit in a 1:1 resonance (see Trojans in astronomy). It is also a non-family asteroid in the Jovian background population. The asteroid orbits the Sun at a distance of 4.9–5.6 AU once every 11 years and 11 months (4,345 days; semi-major axis of 5.21 AU). Its orbit has an eccentricity of 0.07 and an inclination of 24° with respect to the ecliptic.

The body's observation arc begins with a precovery taken at the Siding Spring Observatory in February 1991, nearly 8 years prior to its official discovery observation at Socorro.

Naming 

This minor planet was numbered on 31 August 1999. On 14 May 2021, the object was named by the Working Group Small Body Nomenclature (WGSBN) after Iphinous from Greek mythology. An Achaean soldier who participated in the Trojan War, Iphinous was killed by Glaucus in hand-to-hand combat during the siege of Troy.

Physical characteristics 

Iphinous is a generically assumed C-type asteroid. Many if not most Jupiter trojans show an even darker D or P-type spectrum.

Rotation period 

In 2009 and 2010, two fragmentary lightcurves of Iphinous were obtained from photometric observations by Stefano Mottola at the Calar Alto Observatory in Spain. Lightcurve analysis gave a tentative rotation period of 13.696 and 13.70 hours with a brightness variation of 0.14 and 0.06 magnitude, respectively.

During 2015–2017, three additional photometric observation were made at the Californian Center for Solar System Studies by Robert Stephens, Daniel Coley and Brian Warner in collaboration with Linda French from Illinois Wesleyan University. The two best-rated lightcurves gave a period of 17.383 and 17.44 with an amplitude of 0.08 and 0.11 magnitude, respectively, indicating that the body has a nearly spherical shape.

Diameter and albedo 

According to the surveys carried out by the Japanese Akari satellite, the Infrared Astronomical Satellite IRAS, and the NEOWISE mission of NASA's Wide-field Infrared Survey Explorer, Iphinous measures between 64.71 and 68.98 kilometers in diameter and its surface has an albedo between 0.045 and 0.067.

The Collaborative Asteroid Lightcurve Link derives an albedo of 0.0510 and a diameter of 64.51 kilometers based on an absolute magnitude of 9.8.

Notes

References

External links 
 Asteroid Lightcurve Database (LCDB), query form (info )
 Discovery Circumstances: Numbered Minor Planets (10001)-(15000) – Minor Planet Center
 
 

011395
011395
011395
Named minor planets
19981215